The battle of São Borja was fought on 10 June 1865 at the beginning of the Paraguayan invasion of Rio Grande do Sul during the Paraguayan War.

Battle

Even after the disastrous defeat at the Battle of Riachuelo, the Paraguayan soldiers continued advancing overland towards Rio Grande do Sul, under the command of lieutenant colonel Antonio de la Cruz Estigarribia. Along with them were 5 cannons, 20 canoes, and 30 carts with various supplies.

From that point onwards, Estigarribia began preparations for the offensive and 6,000 men were at his disposal. On the morning of 10 June 1865, on foot and by canoe, his troops slowly crossed the Uruguay River. Colonel Antônio Fernandes Lima, head of the Brazilian forces in the frontier, was warned about Paraguayan movements on the other side of the river, but did not believe in the speed of their preparations. The colonel ordered his forces of 2,000 soldiers to march unhurriedly towards the Paraguayans.

At 10 in the morning the Paraguayans began the attack on São Borja, encountering weak resistance from lancers commanded by colonel Ferreira Guimarães. After about 4 hours of fighting, reinforcements from the 1st Battalion of Fatherland Volunteers arrived at the scene under the command of lieutenant colonel João Manuel Mena Barreto, who found the Paraguayans penetrating the city, at the mouth of São João street (then called General Marques street). 1,400 Paraguayans from the column of captain Diogo Alvarenga were bayoneted by two hundred infantrymen commanded by Floriano Peixoto, who would later become President of Brazil.

Even though the number of reinforcements was only 650 soldiers, it was enough to hold position for two days, giving time for the local population to be evacuated safely. Soon after, on June 12, the village was abandoned by the Brazilians, being occupied and looted by the Paraguayans for a week. On the 19th, the Paraguayans, encouraged by the victory, left for Uruguaiana.

References

Citations

Bibliography

Conflicts in 1865
Battles involving Paraguay
Battles involving Brazil
Battles of the Paraguayan War
History of Rio Grande do Sul
1865 in South America
June 1865 events